Esty is an unincorporated community in Greenbrier County, West Virginia, United States.

Esty Stinespring, an early postmaster, gave the community its name.

References

Unincorporated communities in Greenbrier County, West Virginia
Unincorporated communities in West Virginia